Essie Lin Chia (born May 9, 1947) is a Chinese actress.

Filmography
 Squadron 77 (1965)
 My Dream Boat (1967)
 The Million Eyes of Sumuru (1967)
 The Dragon Creek (1967)
 Three Swinging Girls (1968)
 Spring Blossoms (1968)
 Unfinished Melody (1969)
 Tropical Interlude (1969)
 The Singing Thief (1969)
 Return of the One-Armed Swordsman (1969)
 A Taste of Cold Steel (1970)
 Swordswomen Three (1970)
 Love Without End (1970)
 Love Styles XYZ (1971)
 Long Road To Freedom (1971)
 The Jade Faced Assassin (1971)
 Hotel Esquire (1971)
 Black and White Swordsman (1971)
 Doomsday Machine (1972)
 Black Samurai (1977)
 Pale Passion (1984)

External links

 HK Cinemagic entry
 HKMDB entry

1947 births
Living people
20th-century Chinese actresses